Mitchell Kappenberg (born 5 May 1986) is a Dutch professional footballer, who currently plays for Ter Leede in the Dutch Topklasse. He formerly played for Almere City and Chiangrai United.

External links
 Voetbal International

1986 births
Living people
Dutch footballers
Dutch expatriate footballers
Almere City FC players
AZ Alkmaar players
Eerste Divisie players
Derde Divisie players
Footballers from Haarlem
Expatriate footballers in Thailand
HHC Hardenberg players
Association football midfielders
Ter Leede players